Blitar Regency is a regency in East Java, Indonesia. It covers an area of 1,558.79 km2 and had a population of 1,116,639 at the 2010 Census and 1,223,745 at the 2020 Census; the official estimate as at mid 2021 was 1,242,207. Since 2010, its capital has been located in Kanigoro, after sharing the same capital with Blitar city for more than a century. Blitar city is now a separate administrative entity, enclaved within the regency but completely independent from it.

History
Blitar Regency as an administrative area is believed to be established in 5 August 1324 AD during the reign of King Jayanegara (1309-1328).

Administrative districts 
Blitar Regency (excluding the city) is divided into twenty-two districts (kecamatan), tabulated below with their areas and their population totals from the 2010 Census and the 2020 Census, together with the official estimates as at mid 2021. The table also includes the number of administrative villages (rural desa and urban kelurahan) in each district, and its postal codes. The districts are grouped into southern and northern sectors, which have no administrative or legal significance, but highlight the much lower density in the south of the regency (adjoining the sea) compared with the north (centred on Blitar city).

Notes: (a) including 7 small offshore islands. (b) including 13 small offshore islands. (c) including 8 small offshore islands.

Temples 
Because of its strategic location, Blitar has been important for religious activities in the past, especially Hindu. The most famous temple in this area is Candi Penataran located in Penataran village, Nglegok District.
According to history, Candi Penataran used to be a temple state or the main temple of the kingdom. Candi Penataran was built when King Kertajaya offered sima to adore sira majesty of Lord Palah in the year 1119 Saka (1197 AD).

Other temples are scattered throughout Blitar, including :

 Candi Bacem
 Candi Gambar Wetan
 Candi Kalicilik
 Candi Kotes
 Candi Sawentar
 Candi Sumbernanas
 Candi Plumbangan
 Candi Simping
 Candi Tepas
 Candi Wringin Branjang

Beaches 
 Jolosutro Beach
 Pangi Beach
 Peh Pulo Beach
 Serang Beach
 Tambakrejo Beach

References

Regencies of East Java